Moutoniella is a genus of fungi within the Rhytismataceae family. This is a monotypic genus, containing the single species Moutoniella polita.

The genus name of Moutoniella is in honour of Victor Mouton (1875–1901), who was a Belgian botanist (Mycology and Lichenology), who worked in Liege.

The genus was circumscribed by Albert Julius Otto Penzig and Pier Andrea Saccardo in Malpighia vol.15 on page 221 in 1901.

References

External links 

 Moutoniella at Index Fungorum

Leotiomycetes
Monotypic Leotiomycetes genera